Dov Tamari (29 April 1911 – 11 August 2006), born Bernhard Teitler, was a mathematician.  Born in Fulda, Germany, he left for the British Mandate for Palestine in 1933.  He was known for his work in logic and combinatorics, and the Tamari lattice is named after him. 

Tamari earned a doctorate of science from the University of Paris in 1951, under the direction of Paul Dubreil. His students include Carlton Maxson and Kevin Osondu.  Tamari was living in New York City in 1990 and died in Jerusalem in 2006.

Selected publications

References

Program for the Jubilee Year 2007 of the Justus-Liebig University in Giessen (PDF, in German), p. 133
In Memoriam, Focus, October 2007

See also 
 Associahedra, Tamari Lattices and Related Structures: Tamari Memorial Festschrift

1911 births
2006 deaths
German emigrants to the United States
Jewish emigrants from Nazi Germany to Mandatory Palestine
University of Paris alumni
20th-century Israeli mathematicians
21st-century Israeli mathematicians
People from Fulda